Anam Najam is a Pakistani medical doctor and psychiatrist. She is Pakistan's first and only quadriplegic psychiatrist. She is a recipient of the Chevening Scholarship for higher studies in the United Kingdom.

Early life and education
Najam was born in Muzaffarabad, Azad Jammu and Kashmir, Pakistan. She passed her intermediate from Shaheen Model College in Muzaffarabad and received a distinction in the AJK Board. After completing her MBBS from Ayub Medical College in Abbottabad, she pursued post-graduate studies in psychiatry from the College of Physicians and Surgeons in Karachi. Until 2019, she worked as a psychiatrist at a Combined Military Hospital in Muzaffarabad, following which she was awarded a Chevening Scholarship and left to pursue a Master of Science in War and Psychiatry at King's College London in the United Kingdom.

2008 attack and paralysis
On 15 March 2008, while traveling from Rawalpindi to Muzaffarabad with her family, a group of armed robbers attacked and fired at Najam's car, following which a stray bullet penetrated her neck and led to a severe spinal cord injury that paralyzed her body from below the neck. In October 2010, Najam went to Cologne, Germany for stem-cell therapy, which proved unsuccessful and ultimately led her to lose control over all four of her limbs, a condition known as quadriplegia.

Awards
Empowered, Dignified and Prosperous Woman Achievement Award on Women's Day 2016

References

Further reading

Year of birth missing (living people)
Living people
Pakistani women medical doctors
Women psychiatrists
Shooting survivors
People with tetraplegia
Pakistani psychiatrists